The Fujian Fleet ( or ) founded in 1678 as the Fujian Marine Fleet  was one of China's four regional fleets during the closing decades of the nineteenth century. The fleet was almost annihilated on 23 August 1884 by Admiral Amédée Courbet's Far East Squadron at the Battle of Fuzhou, the opening engagement of the Sino-French War (August 1884–April 1885).

Composition
The Fujian Fleet, which would be the main target of the French attack in August 1884, was considerably weaker than the Beiyang Fleet and the Nanyang Fleet, though slightly stronger than the Guangdong Fleet.  Nearly all of its ships were elderly products of the Foochow Navy Yard.  Its flagship, the wooden corvette Yangwu, was built in 1872.  The other Chinese-built ships included the wooden gunboats Fuxing and Zhenwei (1870 and 1872), the wooden transports Fupo, Feiyun, Ji'an, Yongbao and Chenhang (all built in 1874 or earlier), and the despatch vessel Yixin.  The fleet also included two British-built ships, the 256-ton Rendel 'flatiron' gunboats Jiansheng and Fusheng, which had been ordered by the southern trade commissioner Shen Baozhen in the wake of the Japanese incursion into southern Taiwan in 1874 and were built at Laird's yard in Birkenhead in 1875.

Table 1: Ships of the Fujian Fleet (listed according to date of construction)

The Battle of Fuzhou 

Nine of the eleven vessels of the Fujian Fleet were destroyed in less than an hour during the Battle of Fuzhou (23 August 1884). The Chinese flagship Yangwu was successfully attacked with a spar torpedo and grounded. The despatch vessel Fuxing was also attacked, less successfully, with spar torpedoes, and was finally carried by boarding. She had already been set alight by French shellfire, and was eventually abandoned by the French prize crew and sank in the middle of the Min River. Zhenwei was blown up by a single shell from the ironclad Triomphante, which joined the French squadron minutes before the battle began. Only Fupo and Yixin survived the battle without serious damage, by escaping upriver before the French ships had a chance to engage them.

Fleet acquisitions after 1885 
The Fujian Fleet never recovered from the loss of most of its ships in the Sino-French War.  During the following decade it acquired several new ships, but it was never as large again as it was in 1884.  The composite sloop Henghai (橫海) was completed at the Foochow Navy Yard in late 1885 and entered service with the Fujian Fleet.  The sloop, which had been lying on the slips at the Foochow Navy Yard in August 1884, had been holed by French gunfire in the Battle of Fuzhou (23 August 1884), but the Chinese seem to have repaired the damage rapidly.  Henghai served with the Fujian Fleet for less than a year.  She ran aground off the Pescadores Islands on 30 March 1886 in thick fog, and broke up several days later during a gale after efforts by the warships Fupo (伏波) and Wannianqing (萬年清) to refloat her had failed.

In 1893 the 2,200-ton steel torpedo boat Fujing (福靖) was completed at the Foochow Navy Yard and joined the Fujian Fleet.  She was sent north during the Sino-Japanese War to assist the Beiyang Fleet, but returned to Fujian in 1896 without having seen action.  She sank in a storm near Port Arthur in 1898.

Ships of the Fujian Fleet

Notes

References

 Destelan, P., Annam et Tonkin: Notes de voyage d'un marin (Paris, 1892)
 Duboc, E., Trente cinq mois de campagne en Chine, au Tonkin (Paris, 1899)
 Ferrero, S., Formose, vue par un marin français du XIXe siècle (Paris, 2005)
 Huard, La guerre du Tonkin (Paris, 1887)
 Loir, M., L'escadre de l'amiral Courbet (Paris, 1886)
 Lung Chang [龍章], Yueh-nan yu Chung-fa chan-cheng [越南與中法戰爭, Vietnam and the Sino-French War] (Taipei, 1993)
 Rawlinson, J., China's Struggle for Naval Development, 1839–1895 (Harvard, 1967)
 Rollet de l'Isle, M., Au Tonkin et dans les mers de Chine (Paris, 1886)
 Thomazi, A., La conquête de l'Indochine (Paris, 1934)
 Vienet, R., 'Devant le champ de bataille de Mawei (Chine)', La Géographie, 1525 (June 2007), 31–53
 Wright, R., The Chinese Steam Navy, 1862–1945 (London, 2001)

Chinese fleets
Military units and formations of the Qing dynasty
Naval history of China
Sino-French War